ISSS may refer to:

 International Association for Sports Surface Sciences
 International Society for the Systems Sciences 
 International Superstar Soccer, a sports video game series
 Information-seeking Support System, in Information Retrieval

See also
 IS-3 (disambiguation)